The Tomorrow People is an American science fiction television series developed by Greg Berlanti, Phil Klemmer, and Julie Plec which aired on The CW during the 2013–14 American television season. It was a remake of the original British television series of the same name, created by Roger Price, which ran from 1973 to 1979. The series follows a group of young people who possess psionic powers as the result of human evolution.

The Tomorrow People premiered on October 9, 2013 and ended on May 5, 2014. It originally aired Wednesdays at 9:00 p.m. Eastern/8:00 p.m. Central, but on March 17, 2014, it was moved to Mondays at 9:00 p.m. Eastern/8:00 p.m. Central. On May 8, 2014, The CW cancelled the series after one season.

Premise
The Tomorrow People are humans who, as a result of evolutionary development, have become early instances of the next state of human evolution – Homo superior. However, while they are early examples of their particular human subspecies, they are not the first such generation to have developed such abilities- currently, the oldest Homo superior appear to have started to emerge thirty to forty years ago and exist across the world. As a consequence of their "breaking out" of the limitations of their pre-telepath developmental phase in young adulthood, they develop psionic abilities (the "Three T's" – Telepathy, Teleportation and Telekinesis. A fourth T ability featured in the series is Temporal Manipulation). The series focuses on Stephen Jameson, a newly emergent member of the Tomorrow People, as was his father who, as the most powerful of the Tomorrow People, disappeared years before the current events in the series, trying to find a place where they could live safely. The Tomorrow People are hunted by Ultra, an anti-telepath genetic cleansing organization that uses Tomorrow People to hunt down others and neutralize, or kill, them; their headquarters are designed to neutralize the powers of Tomorrow People, although Stephen seems resistant to its effects. Outside Ultra, their parents, and their loved ones, the existence of the Tomorrow People is unknown to the general public, as they fear greater persecution. Consequently, they spend much of their time in the Lair, a subterranean base of operations beneath the streets of Manhattan.

Cast and characters

Main
 Robbie Amell as Stephen Jameson, who suddenly experiences the onset of psionic abilities, realizing he is of a different human species. He is also a synergist: a second-generation telepath whose parents are both Homo superior. After joining the Tomorrow People, he joins their enemy Ultra as a double agent in order to take the evil group down. He quits Ultra after he found them trying to hunt Astrid down but soon agrees to continue working there. He was in a romantic relationship with Hillary until her death. At the end of the series, he becomes the Tomorrow People's latest leader.
 Peyton List as Cara Coburn, one of the Tomorrow People who encountered her own psionic abilities five years prior to the series, when she was a deaf girl who was attacked by a teenaged boy, which caused her to accidentally kill him when using her powers. She was in a relationship with John. She has now been elected the leader of the Tomorrow People. When questioned who she would risk everything for, her answer was John. While she still loves him, she also has a strange bond with Stephen.
 Luke Mitchell as John Young, leader of the Tomorrow People. He was in a relationship with Cara. He was also a former Ultra agent and Jedikiah's favorite protégé, and comes from a highly dysfunctional family background. Later voted out of his position as leader, then thrown out of the Tomorrow People group by Cara. Unlike other Tomorrow People, Ultra's Annex Project gave him the ability to kill deliberately as opposed to accidentally. He later bonds with Astrid Finch after she pulled the bullet out of him and it is later revealed that Cara is jealous. At the end of the series, he has temporarily lost but then regained his abilities, but has once more become a pawn of Jedikiah Price, former leader of anti-telepath organization Ultra.
 Aaron Yoo as Russell Kwon, another member of the Tomorrow People. He fled his strict, overbearing Korean father and a prospective career as a prodigy concert pianist to become a petty thief. Later after cheating at various casinos, he gained a partner in crime "Talia", whom he turned in after she stole his money to begin a life of super heroism. How he first came in contact with the Lair is unknown but he is John's best friend.
 Madeleine Mantock as Astrid Finch, Stephen's best friend and a 'Sap' (member of the species Homo sapiens). She learns about Stephen's powers and the world of the Tomorrow People, which soon puts her in danger. She has a close bond with Stephen and after nearly being killed twice, develops a close bond with John, who helps her get over her fears.
 Mark Pellegrino as Jedikiah Price, Stephen's uncle, an evolutionary biologist and anti-telepath zealot who is head of Ultra. He was in love with a Tomorrow Person, Morgan, with whom he has fathered a (as yet unborn) child. However Jedikiah has a love/hate relationship with John Young, his former student whom he sees as a son, like John sees him as a father. Despite having tried to kill John numerous times, Jedikiah still cares for him, but later recruits John as the core of a new organization at the end of the series.

Recurring
 Sarah Clarke as Marla Jameson, wife of Jack/Roger and Stephen's mother. It is revealed that she is also an older first-generation Tomorrow Person which explains her son's rare ability to stop time like her husband, Jack, as well as his intensified psionic abilities relative to other, first-generation Tomorrow People like John, Cara, and Russell.
 Jacob Kogan as Luca Jameson, Marla's son and Stephen's brother. He was suspected of being a Tomorrow Person like his brother Stephen, but was revealed to just be smoking cannabis.
 Jeffrey Pierce as Jack Jameson/Roger Price, Stephen's father and Jedikiah's brother. He left Stephen's family when Stephen was a child. It is confirmed in the eighth episode that he had been shot by John after he was ordered to by Jedikiah, and in the fourteenth episode was found cryogenically frozen. He worked with Jedikiah and the Founder to create Ultra. 
 Alexa Vega as Hillary Cole, Ultra agent and one of Stephen's partners who has an initially adversarial but later romantic relationship with him. In the twentieth episode, she betrays Ultra and blows herself up with a bomb which is triggered by a phone call from Astrid to kill the Founder. Before doing this she told Stephen how much she loved him.
 Meta Golding as Darcy Nichols, Ultra agent and one of Stephen's partners. In the sixth episode, it is revealed that she has a sister named Piper, however after betraying Ultra, she is shot dead.
 Nick Eversman Kurt Rundle, he robbed a bank with his powers, in an effort to support his mother.  Later he joined the others in the Lair.  However due to a threat on his mother he betrayed them to an Ultra attack. In response an enraged Cara removed his abilities with Ultra's "Cure". 
 Mitchell Kummen as John Young as a child
 Dan Stevens as TIM (voice only), the Tomorrow People's artificial intelligence, originally stolen from Ultra by John and now currently resident in the Tomorrow People's lair, actively assisting in coordinating their retrieval and recovery of other Tomorrow People from apprehension and murder by Ultra and its henchmen.
 Madeleine Arthur as Charlotte Taylor (A child telepath. Charlotte was experimented on at "The Citadel", an anti-telepath prison, but is later rescued by the Tomorrow People.) She appears to be closest to John.
 Ben Hollingsworth as Agent Troy
 Carly Pope as Morgan Burke, Jedikiah's girlfriend who is a Tomorrow Person and in the sixteenth episode, it is revealed that she is pregnant with his child.
 Nicholas Young as Aldus Crick, a scientist who worked with Roger Price on researching the abilities of Homo superior. He was killed by Ultra. Nicholas Young played John in the original 1973–1979 series.
 Serinda Swan as Cassandra Smythe, the Founder's daughter and a powerful synergist. Her father used her as a guinea pig for unknown experiments. She was accidentally killed by the Founder when he used his telekinesis to deflect a bullet that was meant for him.
 Simon Merrells as Hugh Bathory, better known as "the Founder". An extremely powerful and experienced Tomorrow Person, mysterious head of Ultra, father of Cassandra Smythe and considered a monster. At the end of the series, he disappears into a vortex caused by the malfunction of a time stasis apparatus.
 Leven Rambin as Natalie, a troublemaking telepath with no love for "Saps". Later, she becomes a coldblooded Ultra operative and tries to murder Cara, but is prevented by Stephen's newly disclosed time reversal abilities, which stop the event from ever happening.
 Laura Slade Wiggins as Irene Quinn, a 17-year-old Tomorrow Person and geneticist.

Episodes

Reception

Critical response
The Tomorrow People received mixed reviews, scoring a 50 out of 100 on the review aggregator Metacritic.

Ratings
The pilot episode was watched by a total of 2.96 million viewers.

Accolades

The Tomorrow People was nominated for "Best Youth-Oriented Series on Television" at the 40th Saturn Awards.

Bibliography 

 Davidson, Andy (2022). Jaunt. A Viewer's Guide to the Tomorrow People. London. Ten Acre Films. ISBN 978-1-908630-97-1

References

External links

 
 

2010s American science fiction television series
2010s American drama television series
2013 American television series debuts
2014 American television series endings
American action television series
American television series based on British television series
English-language television shows
Evolution in popular culture
Television series by Fremantle (company)
Television series by CBS Studios
Television series by Warner Bros. Television Studios
Television series created by Greg Berlanti
Television shows set in New York City
Television shows filmed in Vancouver
The CW original programming
The Tomorrow People